Goodenia incana is a species of flowering plant in the family Goodeniaceae and is endemic to the south-west of Western Australia. It is an ascending herb covered with silvery-white hairs, with linear to lance-shaped leaves mostly at the base of the plant, and racemes of blue flowers.

Description

Taxonomy and naming
Goodenia incana was first formally described in 1810 by Robert Brown in his Prodromus Florae Novae Hollandiae et Insulae Van Diemen. The specific epithet (incana) means "grey or hoary".

Distribution and habitat
This goodenia grows in sandy soil in heath and forest and is widespread in the south-west of Western Australia.

References

incana
Eudicots of Western Australia
Plants described in 1810
Taxa named by Robert Brown (botanist, born 1773)
Endemic flora of Australia